Barry Wordsworth (born 20 February 1948, Worcester Park, Surrey, U.K.) is a British conductor.

Wordsworth is Principal Guest Conductor of the Royal Ballet and has had a long relationship with company. He was first appointed as Assistant Conductor to the company's touring orchestra in 1972. In 1973 he became Principal Conductor of the Sadler's Wells Royal Ballet and served as Music Director of the Royal Ballet from 1990 to 1995, and again from 2006 to 2015, after an intervening position with Birmingham Royal Ballet.

From 1989 to 2006 he was principal conductor of the BBC Concert Orchestra, becoming conductor laureate in 2006. Since 1989 he has been Music Director and the Principal Conductor of the Brighton Philharmonic Orchestra (BPO). In March 2007 at Brighton, Wordsworth caused controversy when he refused to conduct Andrew Gant's new composition A British Symphony the day of its scheduled premiere.

Wordsworth's discography includes works by lesser-known British composers alongside more mainstream pieces. In his career Wordsworth has appeared with orchestras in the UK and overseas. He has made appearances at the BBC Proms and conducted the Last Night of the Proms in 1993 with the BBC Symphony Orchestra. In 2003, he was the first conductor to record commercially all nine surviving movements of Constant Lambert's ballet Horoscope (only a suite of five movements had previously been recorded).

References

External links
 IMG Artists agency biography of Barry Wordsworth
 BBC Concert Orchestra biography of Barry Wordsworth
 Jonathan Woolf, Music Web International review of ASV CD DCA 1168, August 2004

1948 births
Living people
British male conductors (music)
English conductors (music)
People from Worcester Park
Alumni of Trinity College of Music
People educated at Glyn School
21st-century British conductors (music)
21st-century British male musicians